Il giovedì grasso is a farsa in one act by Gaetano Donizetti, from a libretto by Domenico Gilardoni. The literal translation of the title is  "Fat Thursday", a reference to Carnival celebration. The libretto was adapted from the French comedies Monsieur de Pourceaugnac by Molière and Le nouveau Pourceaugnac by Charles-Gaspard Delestre-Poirson and Eugène Scribe. The opera uses spoken dialogue rather than recitatives, and the buffo role is given in the Neapolitan language. The work premiered at the Teatro del Fondo in Naples on 26 February 1829.

Roles

Synopsis 
Time: 17th century
Place: "A house in the country, outside Paris"

The lovers Nina and Teodoro are in despair since Nina is promised to another man, Ernesto. Their friend Sigismondo (who is mistakenly jealous of his wife Camilla) concocts a scheme to help the lovers. Inspired by Molière's Monsieur de Pourceaugnac, Sigismondo proposes that he and his wife will dress up as on "Fat Thursday". Then they will play tricks on Ernesto, whom they believe to be a mere simpleton, so that he will flee in confusion. Sigismondo will pose as a friend from Ernesto's past, and Camilla, as a former lover betrayed by Ernesto.  When Ernesto arrives, he happens to learn of the scheme, and decides to turn the tables on the others. Pretending to be deceived, he treats Sigismondo as an old friend and treats Camilla as his former lover, which confirms Sigismondo in his misplaced suspicions. Only when Nina's father the Colonel is back does Ernesto confess to everyone that he, the supposed simpleton, has outwitted them. Ernesto consents to the wedding of Nina and Teodoro, Sigismondo promises never to be jealous again, and all praise the carnival season.

Recordings

1961
James Loomis (bass), Bruna Rizzoli (sop), Rodolfo Malacarne (ten), Nestore Catalani (bar), Orchestra della Radiotelevisione della Svizzera Italiana (Edwin Loehrer)
Audio CD Nuovo Era (Membran)  232585 (released 2009)

References
Notes

Sources
Allitt, John Stewart (1991), Donizetti: in the light of Romanticism and the teaching of Johann Simon Mayr, Shaftesbury: Element Books, Ltd (UK); Rockport, MA: Element, Inc.(USA)
Ashbrook, William (1982), Donizetti and His Operas, Cambridge University Press.  
Ashbrook, William (1998), "Donizetti, Gaetano" in Stanley Sadie  (Ed.),  The New Grove Dictionary of Opera, Vol. One. London: Macmillan Publishers, Inc.   
Ashbrook, William and Sarah Hibberd (2001), in  Holden, Amanda (Ed.), The New Penguin Opera Guide, New York: Penguin Putnam. .  pp. 224 – 247.
Black, John (1982), Donizetti’s Operas in Naples, 1822—1848. London: The Donizetti Society.
Loewenberg, Alfred (1970). Annals of Opera, 1597-1940, 2nd edition.  Rowman and Littlefield
Osborne, Charles, (1994),  The Bel Canto Operas of Rossini, Donizetti, and Bellini,  Portland, Oregon: Amadeus Press. 
Sadie, Stanley, (Ed.); John Tyrell (Exec. Ed.) (2004), The New Grove Dictionary of Music and Musicians.  2nd edition. London: Macmillan.    (hardcover).   (eBook).
 Weinstock, Herbert (1963), Donizetti and the World of Opera in Italy, Paris, and Vienna in the First Half of the Nineteenth Century, New York: Pantheon Books.

External links
 Donizetti Society (London) website

Italian-language operas
Operas by Gaetano Donizetti
1829 operas
Operas based on plays
Operas
Operas based on works by Molière
Operas based on works by Eugène Scribe
One-act operas
Operas set in France
Farse